Crocidema is a genus of broad-nosed weevils in the beetle family Curculionidae. There are about six described species in Crocidema.

Species
These six species belong to the genus Crocidema:
 Crocidema arizonica Van Dyke, 1951 i c g b
 Crocidema attenuata Van Dyke, 1934 i g
 Crocidema attenullta Van Dyke, 1934 c g
 Crocidema californica Van Dyke, 1934 i c g b
 Crocidema nigrior Van Dyke, 1934 i c g
 Crocidema planifrons Van Dyke, 1934 i c g
Data sources: i = ITIS, c = Catalogue of Life, g = GBIF, b = Bugguide.net

References

Further reading

 
 
 
 

Entiminae
Articles created by Qbugbot